Cratiria is a genus of lichenized fungi in the family Caliciaceae. The genus has a widespread distribution, especially in tropical regions, and contains about 20 species. The genus was circumscribed by Austrian lichenologist Bernhard Marbach in 2000, with Cratiria lauri-cassiae assigned as the type species.

Species
Cratiria aggrediens 
Cratiria americana 
Cratiria amphorea 
Cratiria burleighensis  – Australia
Cratiria chloraceus 
Cratiria dissimilis 
Cratiria exalbida 
Cratiria jamesiana 
Cratiria lauri-cassiae 
Cratiria lauri-cassiaeoides 
Cratiria mayrhoferi  – Australia
Cratiria megaobscurior 
Cratiria melanochlora 
Cratiria obscurior 
Cratiria paramoensis 
Cratiria rutilans 
Cratiria rutilantoides 
Cratiria saltensis 
Cratiria sorediata  – Seychelles
Cratiria streimannii  – Australia
Cratiria submuriformis 
Cratiria subtropica  – Australia
Cratiria verdonii  – Australia
Cratiria vioxanthina

References

Caliciales
Lichen genera
Caliciales genera
Taxa described in 2000